Starfish flower may refer to:

Stapelia grandiflora, a species of flowering plant in the genus Stapelia
Stapelia hirsuta, a species of flowering plant in the genus Stapelia